Navy Island may refer to:
 Navy Island, in the Niagara River, Ontario, Canada
 Navy Island (Saint John), New Brunswick, Canada
 Navy Island, Jamaica
 Navy Island (Minnesota), now Raspberry Island, in the Mississippi River, United States